Gao Gao is a male giant panda formerly at the San Diego Zoo. He was returned to China in 2018. To date, he has fathered five giant pandas in captivity.

History
Gao Gao was born in the wild in China, around 1990, and was taken to the Fengtongzhai Nature Reserve in 1993 suffering from injuries which resulted in the loss of nearly two thirds of his left ear.

On April 12, 1995, Gao Gao was released to the wild in good health, as featured in the Chinese documentary Returning Home. However, his release was brief, as he was too disruptive to the local villages.  He was then brought to the Wolong Panda Conservation Center in 2002.

Gao Gao arrived at the San Diego Zoo in January 2003 and replaced Shi Shi as Bai Yun's mate.  This has proven to be a very successful pairing — Gao Gao and Bai Yun are the parents of Mei Sheng (M), Su Lin (F), Zhen Zhen (F), Yun Zi (M), and Xiao Liwu (M),  all conceived via natural mating. He has three grandchildren, among them a male born to Su Lin on July 7, 2011.

On October 30, 2018, Gao Gao left the San Diego Zoo, and returned to China as the end of his 15 year loan agreement was reached.

Genetic anomaly 
Gao Gao, being wild-born, is considered a valuable contributor to the captive giant panda gene pool. One noteworthy genetic trait that he has passed on to the oldest four of his offspring is webbed toes.

See also
Captive breeding
List of giant pandas

Footnotes and references

External links 
 San Diego Zoo Giant Panda Research Station

Individual giant pandas
1992 animal births
San Diego Zoo